Muharrem Candaş (1921 – 19 October 2009) was a Turkish wrestler. He competed in the men's freestyle light heavyweight at the 1948 Summer Olympics.

References

External links
 

1921 births
2009 deaths
Turkish male sport wrestlers
Olympic wrestlers of Turkey
Wrestlers at the 1948 Summer Olympics
Sportspeople from İzmir
World Wrestling Championships medalists